Jean Fonteyne (1899–1974) was a Belgian lawyer, resistant, politician and filmmaker born in May 1899 in Ledeberg (near Ghent in East Flanders) and died on 22 June 1974 .

1899 births
1974 deaths
Belgian film directors
20th-century Belgian lawyers